Franck Dja Djédjé (born 2 June 1986) is an Ivorian professional footballer who plays as a striker for US Cap d'Ail.

Club career
Dja Djédjé came to France from his country of birth at the 12 years age, where he signed with SC Solitaire de Paris at youth level, before moving on to the youth setup at French giants Paris Saint-Germain at the age of 13. He rose to the ranks of the senior team, before moving to Stade Brestois 29 on loan for the 2004–05 season. For the 2006–07 season joined Ligue 2 club Grenoble Foot 38 on loan. On 30 January 2009, he moved to another rival team RC Strasbourg and on 31 August 2009 Vannes OC have signed the forward on loan.

He signed for French Ligue 1 club AC Arles-Avignon in July 2010.

On 26 August 2011, it was announced that Dja Djédjé would move to Ligue 1 outfit OGC Nice, signing a three-year deal..

At the start of March 2014, Dja Djédjé left Chornomorets Odesa due to the civil unrest caused by the 2014 Ukrainian revolution, and went on to sign a three-month contract with Norwegian side Sarpsborg 08 at the end of the month.

Following the expiration of his Sarpsborg 08 contract, he signed for Dinamo Minsk on 2 September 2014, on a contract till the end of the season, with the option of an extension.

On 5 January 2015, Dja Djédjé signed for Hibernian. He cut short his contract by a year to move to Qatari club Al-Shahania in June 2015. He left Al-Shahania in July 2016.

In January 2017, he went on trial with Kazakhstan Premier League side Irtysh Pavlodar.

On 7 July 2017, Dja Djédjé signed with FC Kaisar until the end of the season.

International career
Dja Djédjé has played internationally for France in their Under-17, Under-18 and Under-19 team, gaining a large number of caps. In 2005, he won the European U-19 Championship with France in Belfast.

In 2008, he was selected to represent Ivory Coast at the 2008 Summer Olympics, just right before his nationality transfer deadline—his 21st birthday.

Personal life
He has dual French and Ivorian nationality.

Career statistics

Club
.

References

External links
 
 

1986 births
Living people
Footballers from Abidjan
Ivorian footballers
French footballers
Association football forwards
France youth international footballers
Ivorian emigrants to France
Ivorian expatriate sportspeople in France
Ivorian expatriate sportspeople in Ukraine
Ivorian expatriate sportspeople in Belarus
Ivorian expatriate sportspeople in Norway
Ivorian expatriate sportspeople in Scotland
France under-21 international footballers
Footballers at the 2008 Summer Olympics
Olympic footballers of Ivory Coast
Ivorian expatriate footballers
Expatriate footballers in Ukraine
Expatriate footballers in Norway
Expatriate footballers in Belarus
Expatriate footballers in Scotland
Expatriate footballers in Qatar
Expatriate footballers in Kazakhstan
Ligue 1 players
Ligue 2 players
Ukrainian Premier League players
Scottish Professional Football League players
Qatari Second Division players
Paris Saint-Germain F.C. players
Stade Brestois 29 players
Grenoble Foot 38 players
RC Strasbourg Alsace players
Vannes OC players
AC Arlésien players
OGC Nice players
FC Chornomorets Odesa players
Sarpsborg 08 FF players
FC Dinamo Minsk players
Hibernian F.C. players
Al-Shahania SC players
FC Irtysh Pavlodar players
FC Kaisar players
AS Cannes players